Chloroclystis blanda is a moth in the family Geometridae. It was described by Max Bastelberger in 1911. It is endemic to Taiwan.

References

Moths described in 1911
blanda
Moths of Taiwan
Endemic fauna of Taiwan